Irena Komancová is a Czechoslovak retired slalom canoeist who competed in the early 1970s. She won a bronze medal in the K-1 team event at the 1971 ICF Canoe Slalom World Championships in Meran.

References

External links 
 Irena KOMANCOVA at CanoeSlalom.net

Czechoslovak female canoeists
Living people
Year of birth missing (living people)
Medalists at the ICF Canoe Slalom World Championships